Adolphus Cornelius Frazier (March 28, 1935 – December 2, 2018) was an American former gridiron football player.  He played professionally as  halfback for three seasons with the Denver Broncos in the American Football League (AFL).  He set many franchise record for receptions out of the backfield, some of which still stand.  Frazier played two seasons in the Canadian Football League (CFL): 1957 with the Toronto Argonauts and 1960 with the Grey Cup champion Ottawa Rough Riders.

After his football career ended, he earned a master's degree from Teachers College, Columbia University and worked for over 30 years at York College, City University of New York, where he was Assistant Dean of Student Development at the time of his retirement in 2006.

's NFL off-season, Al Frazier held at least 3 Broncos franchise records, including:
 Receiving Yds: rookie game (166 on 1961-10-15 OAK)
 Receiving TDs: rookie season (6 in 1961)
 100+ yard receiving games: rookie season (3)

Frazier died on December 2, 2018 in Lawrenceville, Georgia.

References

External links
 
 

1935 births
2018 deaths
American football halfbacks
Denver Broncos (AFL) players
Florida A&M Rattlers football players
Ottawa Rough Riders players
Toronto Argonauts players
York College, City University of New York faculty
Teachers College, Columbia University alumni
Players of American football from Jacksonville, Florida